Mairena del Alcor is a city located in the province of Seville, Spain. According to the 2020 census, the city has a population of 23698.

Located in the heart of the Los Alcores region, it is about 20 km from the national capital, Seville, and is well known for its oranges and flamenco music.

History

Prehistory and classical antiquity
The area of Los Alcores was a settlement of ancient civilizations since prehistoric times. There are archeological sites that prove the continuous use of the area since the Upper Paleolithic. Later on, during Neolithic times, small villages settled to explore agriculture properties of the land. In addition, several artifacts from the Metal Ages have been found, such as megalithic tombs and ceramic items.

The treasure of 'Andres Morales', consisting of complex gold jewels, evidences the presence of Tartessians during the first millennium.

In later times, Phoenicians, Greeks, Turdetani, Romans, Visigoths and Arabs have inhabited the area.

Middle ages
At the time Arabs rule the region a defensive tower was built, maybe as part of a surveillance belt, defense of communication across Los Alcores.

In the campaign of 1246, the village of Mairena was conquered by Castilian king Fernando III. On November 20, 1342, king Alfonso XI granted the estate of Mairena to Pedro Ponce de León, separating this from Carmona's jurisdiction. Since that time, the village has belonged to Casa de Arcos and a castle was built in the 14th century which promoted the development of a small town.

Not much later in 1441, the King Juan II conceded permission for the celebration of a live stock market, which continues as a traditional festival today.

Modern period
During the Renaissance the town of Mairena undergoes a significant growth thanks to the Discovery of America and the trans-Athlantic trades.

Production of olive oil and cereals is increased and successful farming and taming of horses become an art.

References

Demography
The first census dates from 1842 when the population was 3623.

Recent censuses measure the people officially established in Mairena del Alcor as follows:

{|Demographics of Mairena del Alcor
|2002=16.947|2004=17.623|2006=18.710|2008=19.924|2010=21.100|2012=22.024|2014=22.447|2016=23.047|2017=23.222|2018=23.473|2019=23.550|2020=23.698|fuente=INE-es|}

External links

Ayuntamiento de Mairena del Alcor
Mairena del Alcor - Sistema de Información Multiterritorial de Andalucía

Municipalities of the Province of Seville